Mayeul Akpovi (born January 5, 1979) is a Beninese photographer.

Biography

Passionate about photography since late 2011 in Besançon (France), Akpovi specialized in the time-lapse technique. He spent his childhood in the streets of Cotonou (Benin) and part of his career (as a developer) in France including Paris and Besançon.

His photographic work is focused on the capture of time and space as accelerated video called time-lapse or stop-motion time-lapse hyperlapse. Akpovi is known for his tribute videos to the city of Paris. In July 2013, he performed the first hyperlapse video dedicated to an African city.

Photography

 2012: Besançon in Motion
 2012: Paris in Motion, (Part I), (Part II), (Part III) and (Part IV) – videos on Vimeo and YouTube
 2013: Cotonou in Motion, first experience in Africa

See also
 List of photographers

References

1979 births
Beninese photographers
Living people
People from Cotonou